Tasikmalaya is a landlocked city in West Java, Indonesia. The city is sometimes dubbed kota santri (city of religious learners) or "the City of a Thousand Pesantrens" for its abundance of Islamic boarding schools.

The city is located in the mountainous Priangan region of Java at an elevation of 351 metres (1,151 feet).

The population of the city (excluding the Tasikmalaya Regency, which surrounds the city to the west, south and east) was 634,948 according to the 2010 census, and increased to 716,155 at the 2020 census; the official estimate as at mid 2021 was 723,921. Its built-up (or metro) area (made of Tasikmalaya City and 14 neighbouring districts spread over Tasikmalaya and Ciamis Regencies) was home to 1,339,891 inhabitants as at the 2010 census.

Demographics
The population of the city Tasikmalaya according to the intermediate censuses in the years 2005 and 2015, and the full censuses in 2010 and 2020, are listed below:

Administrative districts
Tasikmalaya city is divided into ten districts (kecamatan), listed below with their areas and their populations at the 2010 census and the 2020 census, together with the official estimates as at mid 2021. The table also includes the number of administrative villages (desa and keluraham) in each district, and its post code.

1996 riot
The city of Tasikmalaya was the site of a widely reported riot in late December 1996. Four people were killed and several churches and dozens of mostly Chinese-owned businesses were destroyed in the violence, which was triggered by allegations of police brutality. It was also fueled and angered by frustration with allegedly corrupt local government officials. The event was among the earliest of many riots with religion- and class-based undertones that occurred in Java during the late 1990s.

Natural disasters
On 5 April 1982, the volcano of Gunung Galunggung erupted about 24 km from the city, causing major damage through lahar and ash projection, and forcing a temporary evacuation of the area.

On 2 September 2009 a magnitude 7 earthquake struck, destroying a number of buildings in the city and killing several people.

On 26 June 2010, a magnitude 6.3 earthquake struck Tasikmalaya at 4:45pm Waktu Indonesia Barat (WIB). No injuries or destroyed buildings were reported.

On 20 May 2012, a magnitude 5 earthquake struck. It happened at 07:37pm Waktu Indonesia Barat (WIB). No injuries or destroyed buildings were reported.

Toll Road
A toll road was planned to be built in 2018 connecting Tasikmalaya and Bandung's Ring Road 2.

Wiriadinata Airport
Wiriadinata Airport in Cibeureum (also called Cibeureum Airport) was solely a military airport, but on 9 June 2017 it became a military airport with a civil airport enclave. With its 1,200 metres runway, it can accommodate ATR 72-600 aircraft.

Archeology
Several Idols of the Gods, including Ganesha were found at the banks of the Parit Galunggung river in 2020.

Climate
Tasikmalaya has a tropical rainforest climate (Af) with heavy to very heavy rainfall year-round.

Famous People
Mu'min Ainul Mubarak
Rhoma Irama
Farida Pasha
Susi Susanti
Yayan Ruhian

Pictures gallery

References

External links

 
Populated places in West Java